Balga has several possible meanings, including:
 Balga, a ruined fortress and abandoned village in Russia
 Balga, a common name for the western Australian plant, Xanthorrhoea preissii
 Balga, Western Australia, a suburb near the state capital

See also 
 Khar Balgas, a Mongolian archaeological site